Concordia University of Edmonton, is a publicly funded independent academic institution in Edmonton, Alberta, Canada; accredited under the Alberta Post-secondary Learning Act. Concordia offers arts, science, and management undergraduate degree programs, as well as graduate degree programs in education, information technology, information security, and psychology. Concordia is primarily funded by tuition and private donations and as of the 2022, receives nearly one third of its funding from the government of Alberta.

History
Concordia University of Edmonton was founded in 1921 as Concordia College by the Lutheran Church–Missouri Synod to prepare young men for preaching and teaching in the Christian church. It was essentially a high school for many decades. It introduced co-education in 1939, offering general study courses and an accredited high school program. In 1967, Concordia began offering first-year university courses in affiliation with the University of Alberta. Affiliation for second-year courses began in 1975. The university graduated its first cohort of Bachelor of Arts and Bachelor of Science three-year degrees in 1988, gradually expanding to other disciplines and four-year programs. A formal separation between the high school and college (degree granting) was initiated in 1994.

The affiliation with the University of Alberta officially ended in 1991 by mutual agreement. Concordia College operated as a denominational college affiliated with the public sector until 1987, when the Province of Alberta allowed Concordia to start operating as a private degree-granting university college. Concordia changed its name from Concordia College to Concordia University College of Alberta in 1995. The high school program that had run within Concordia since 1939 separated into an independent institution called Concordia High School in 2000. Both institutions shared the same campus until July 2011. In 2014, the Alberta government announced that Concordia would be allowed to drop the word "college" from its name, allowing Concordia to call itself a university. On May 1, 2015, Concordia University College of Alberta was renamed Concordia University of Edmonton.

Although the university had indicated its intention to continue relationships with Lutheran organizations and alumni, in November 2015 Concordia removed references to Christianity from its mission statement, effectively self-identifying as a secular institution. Concordia's religious constituency had not fully funded the school since 1978, and in 2015, with religious financial support at 0.1 per cent of the school's $30 million budget, the board decided to secularize. The secularization was formally announced in April 2016.

On January 4, 2022, the Concordia University of Edmonton Faculty Association (CUEFA) began a strike over concerns surrounding pay and workload. This was the first strike by an Albertan faculty association since they had gained the right to do so under the Labour Relations Code in 2017. The strike lasted for 11 days, with CUEFA and the university reaching a four-year collective agreement on January 15. As a result of the strike, the start of the 2022 winter semester was delayed until January 19.

Programs and faculties

The university has five faculties and two schools: Faculty of Arts, Faculty of Education, Faculty of Graduate Studies, Faculty of Management, Faculty of Science, School of Physical Education and Wellness, and School of Music. The university offers 45 majors and minors in the fields of arts, science, and management; two after-degree programs, three master's degrees, and several graduate certificates and diplomas. The University of Lethbridge had a small extension campus at the university from 2012 to 2015. Bright Horizons Childcare and the Concordia Lutheran Seminary also share the university grounds.

Campus life features a community orchestra, a community choir, a women's choir, a touring choir, and regular drama productions. There are three dormitory buildings on campus: Founders Hall, Eberhardt Hall, and Wangerin House. Two more residences are designated for students taking after-degree or masters' programs. The university has a gymnasium and a large athletic field on campus. In the past the field was sometimes used for spring practice by the Edmonton Elks football team.

Crest

Concordia's crest was designed in 1921 and was in continual use as a logo until 1991, when it was updated to remove the word "college" from the title. In 2010 the crest was retired as the visual identity of Concordia. It remains in use on legal documents as a seal, and on degree diplomas. A new logo was adopted in 2010. It reflects Concordia's front entrance of the historic Schwermann Hall, built in 1926, which also mirrors the castle church door in Wittenberg, Germany, on which Martin Luther nailed the 95 Theses, sparking the Reformation. Further, the logo's curved lines represents the shore and waters of the North Saskatchewan River, which lies directly below Concordia, in the Highlands neighborhood of Edmonton.

Notable alumni
 Lynne Bowen, university professor, oral historian and writer—CUE Distinguished Alumni Award 2000 winner

 Nathan Fillion, actor
 Sarah Hoffman, politician
 Sam Lam, soccer player

Athletics

The Concordia Thunder compete in the Alberta Colleges Athletic Conference (Provincial Level) and the Canadian Colleges Athletic Association (National Level). Team sports include: badminton, basketball, curling, golf, hockey, soccer, cross country running, and volleyball. Each sport includes participation by both men and women on separate teams with the exception of hockey, which only has a men's team. Thunder alumni include: Andrew Parker, a basketball player who competes for the Edmonton Energy of the International Basketball League. Another notable Concordia alumnus, Daniel Veenstra, became prominent in the diving world by placing a spot on the 2012 Canadian Olympic team.

References

External links
 Concordia University of Edmonton

Universities and colleges in Edmonton
Universities in Alberta
Lutheranism in Canada
Educational institutions established in 1921
1921 establishments in Alberta